Sanskritism is a term used to indicate words that are coined out of Sanskrit for modern usage in India, in Sri Lanka and elsewhere or for neologisms. These terms are similar in nature to taxon terms coined from Latin and Greek.

References
Influence of Sanskritisms in Sinhala

Sanskrit
Neologisms
Word coinage